Ohio County is a county located in southeastern Indiana. With a 2020 population of 5,940, and an area of just 87 square miles, Ohio County is the smallest county in Indiana by area and the least populous. The county seat and only incorporated municipality is Rising Sun. The county was officially established in 1844 and was one of the last Indiana counties to be created. Ohio County borders the state of Kentucky across the Ohio River for which it was named. It is part of the Cincinnati, OH-KY-IN Metropolitan Statistical Area. The county is divided into four townships which provide local services. Three state roads pass through or into the county.

History
Dearborn County was formed from Indiana Territory in 1803, and its borders were modified several times, both before and after the creation of the state of Indiana in 1816. Ohio County was created out of Dearborn County, authorized by legislative action effective January 4, 1844 to resolve a dispute of county seat between Rising Sun and Lawrenceburg. It was named for the Ohio River, which defines its eastern border.

The Ohio County courthouse was built in the county seat of Rising Sun in 1845. This courthouse is still in use and is the oldest continuously used courthouse in the state.

Geography

Adjacent counties
 Boone County, Kentucky – east
 Dearborn County – north
 Ripley County – northwest
 Switzerland County – south

Communities

Incorporated communities
 Rising Sun – on the banks of the Ohio River

Unincorporated communities

 Aberdeen
 Bascom Corner
 Bear Branch
 Blue
 Buffalo
 Camp Shore
 Cofield Corner
 Downey Corner
 Hartford
 Milton
 North Landing

Townships
 Cass
 Pike
 Randolph
 Union

Transportation

Highways
 US Route 50 in Dearborn County passes within  of Ohio County's northern border.
 State Road 56 enters from Switzerland County to the south and passes east along the southern border, then north through Rising Sun and along the river, continuing north to Dearborn county.
 State Road 156 runs along the Ohio River in Switzerland County, and enters the far southeast part of Ohio County, continuing NW and north to its intersection with State Road 56, 1.5 miles inside Ohio County.
 State Road 262 enters from Dillsboro and crosses the county in a general eastern direction, ending in Rising Sun.

Railroads
There are no active railroad lines in the county.

Education
Ohio County has two schools managed by a single school corporation. The Ohio County Elementary–Middle School served a total of 636 students during the 2009–2010 school year. Rising Sun High School served a total of 264 students during the same period.

Ohio County residents are served by the Ohio County Public Library with a single branch in Rising Sun.

Climate and weather

Government

The county government is a constitutional body granted specific powers by the Constitution of Indiana and the Indiana Code. The county council is the legislative branch of the county government and controls all spending and revenue collection. Representatives are elected from county districts. The council members serve four-year terms and are responsible for setting salaries, the annual budget and special spending. The council also has limited authority to impose local taxes, in the form of an income and property tax that is subject to state level approval, excise taxes and service taxes.

A board of commissioners serves as the county's executive body. The commissioners are elected county–wide to staggered four–year terms. One commissioner serves as board president. The board executes the acts legislated by the council, collects revenue, and manages day-to-day functions of the county government.

The county maintains a small claims court that can handle some civil cases. The judge on the court is elected to a term of four years and must be a member of the Indiana Bar Association. The judge is assisted by a constable who is elected to a four-year term. In some cases, court decisions can be appealed to the state level circuit court which is shared with neighboring Dearborn County.

The county has several other elected offices, including sheriff, coroner, auditor, treasurer, recorder, surveyor and circuit court clerk; they are elected to four–year terms. Members elected to county government positions are required to declare party affiliations and be residents of the county.

Each of the townships has a trustee who administers rural fire protection and ambulance service, provides poor relief and manages cemetery care, among other duties. The trustee is assisted in these duties by a three-member township board. The trustees and board members are elected to four-year terms.

Ohio County is part of Indiana's 6th congressional district; Indiana Senate district 43; and Indiana House of Representatives district 68.

Demographics

As of the 2010 United States Census, there were 6,128 people, 2,477 households, and 1,737 families residing in the county. The racial makeup of the county was 98.1% white, 0.4% black or African American, 0.3% Asian, 0.2% American Indian, 0.3% from other races, and 0.7% from two or more races. Those of Hispanic or Latino origin made up 1.1% of the population. In terms of ancestry, 33.5% were German, 12.6% were Irish, 12.2% were American, and 7.3% were English.

Of the 2,477 households, 28.7% had children under the age of 18 living with them, 56.2% were married couples living together, 9.8% had a female householder with no husband present, 29.9% were non-families, and 25.2% of all households were made up of individuals. The average household size was 2.45 and the average family size was 2.91. The median age was 43.7 years.

The median income for a household in the county was $47,697 and the median income for a family was $64,271. Males had a median income of $49,241 versus $30,536 for females. The per capita income for the county was $25,703. About 5.5% of families and 8.4% of the population were below the poverty line, including 11.4% of those under age 18 and 8.6% of those age 65 or over.

See also
 National Register of Historic Places listings in Ohio County, Indiana

References

External links
 Ohio County in Indiana State website
 
 

 
Indiana counties
1844 establishments in Indiana
Indiana counties on the Ohio River
Populated places established in 1844